Keep It Right Here may refer to:

 a song on Solo's 1995 eponymous album
 a song on Survivor's 1986 album When Seconds Count

See also 
 Keep It Right There (disambiguation)